Crystal Tovar Aragón (born 23 January 1990) is a Mexican politician. As of 2013 she served as Deputy of the LXII Legislature of the Mexican Congress representing Chihuahua.

References

1990 births
Living people
People from Chihuahua (state)
Women members of the Chamber of Deputies (Mexico)
Party of the Democratic Revolution politicians
21st-century Mexican politicians
21st-century Mexican women politicians
Deputies of the LXII Legislature of Mexico
Members of the Chamber of Deputies (Mexico) for Chihuahua (state)